Highlands is a suburb of Johannesburg, South Africa. It is located in Region 8. Highlands occupies one of the highest points of Johannesburg and has commanding views over the mine dumps of the southern city. Much of the surrounding area has lost its real estate value but property values are expected to recover if the inner city realises its long-awaited regeneration. Westminster Mansions is the areas most prestigious apartment block, with 24 small but well-appointed flats occupied mostly by their owners.

References

Johannesburg Region F